The 2018 Americas Rugby Championship was the third series of the Americas Rugby Championship (sometimes informally called the "Americas' Six Nations", a reference to Europe's Six Nations Championship), which is the top elite tournament for the Americas nations. It was contested by Argentina XV (Argentina's secondary national team), Canada, United States, Uruguay, Brazil, and Chile. All matches were full international test matches with caps awarded, except those involving Argentina XV.

The Championship was retained by the United States, who became the first nation to win the Grand Slam ARC title, winning all five games.

Participants

Table

Squads

Fixtures
The tournament will be played in a round-robin format, with each team playing the five others once. The fixtures were announced on 10 December 2017. The opening fixture will take place a week early to the following two games of the same round, with it doubling up as a 2019 Rugby World Cup Americas qualifier match for Canada and Uruguay.

Week 1

Notes:
 This is the first time that Uruguay has beaten Canada in Canada.
 This was the first leg of the 2019 Rugby World Cup Americas 2 qualification

Week 2

Notes:
 This is the first time that Brazil has beaten Chile in Chile.
 Lucca Avelli, Alfonso Escobar and Nicolás Garafulic (all Chile) made their international debuts.

Week 3

Notes:
 Andrés de León and Tomás Inciarte (both Uruguay) made their international debuts.
 Juan Manuel Gaminara (Uruguay) earned his 50th test cap.

Notes:
 Josh Whippy (United States) and Luke Campbell, Cole Davis and Dustin Dobravsky (all Canada) made their international debuts.
 D. T. H. van der Merwe (Canada) earned his 50th test cap.

Week 4

Notes:
 Malon Al-Jiboori, Brendan Daly, Ruben de Haas, Dylan Fawsitt, Paul Lasike and Psalm Wooching (all United States) and Iñaki de Urruticoechea, Basilio Díaz, José Tomás Maturana and Martín Raddatz (all Chile) made their international debuts.

Notes:
 Doug Fraser, Martial Lagain and Cameron Polson (all Canada) and Michael Moraes (Brazil) made their international debuts.

Week 5

Notes:
 Juan Manuel Etcheverry (Uruguay) made his international debut.

Notes:
 Daniel Lima and Angelo Marcucci (both Brazil) made their international debuts.

Week 6

Notes:
 Noah Barker and Josh Thiel (both Canada) made their international debuts.

Statistics

Most points

Most tries

Attendances

Top 5

Average home attendances

References

External links

2018
2018 rugby union tournaments for national teams
2018 in Canadian rugby union
rugby union
rugby union
rugby union
2018 in American rugby union
2018 in Argentine rugby union
2018 in North American rugby union
2018 in South American rugby union
February 2018 sports events in North America
February 2018 sports events in South America